Charles Richard was a Canadian politician.

Charles Richard may also refer to:
Charles A. Richard (c. 1959-), United States Navy admiral
Brig. Gen. Charles Richard, Acting Surgeon General of the United States Army (August 29, 1918 to October 30, 1918) during WWI while William Gorgas is away in France. US Army Brigadier General.
Charles-Louis Richard (1711–1794), Catholic theologian and publicist
Charlie Richard (1941–1994), American football player and coach

See also

Charles Richards (disambiguation)
Richard (surname)